Boiga kraepelini, commonly known as the square-headed cat snake, Kelung cat snake, or Taiwanese tree snake is a species of mildly venomous, rear-fanged  snake in the family Colubridae. The species is endemic to East Asia and Southeast Asia (Taiwan, China, Vietnam, and Laos). Its specific name, kraepelini, honours Karl Kraepelin, a German naturalist. The common name, Kelung cat snake, refers to its type locality, Keelung in northern Taiwan.

Description
Its head and eyes are large (the head is twice the width of the neck), hence the Chinese name meaning "big-headed snake". The pupils are cat-like, as is typical for the genus. The colouration of the upper surface of the body and tail is usually amber or brown to copper brown, with irregular brown to diffuse black cross bands along the vertebral line.

Reproduction
B. kraepelini is oviparous. Females lay 5–14 eggs per clutch in summer.

Behaviour and venom
B. kraepelini can be quite aggressive, forming a defensive coil and striking in a viper-like fashion when threatened. The properties of the venom are poorly known, but it is considered only mildly venomous.

Geographic range
B. kraepelini is found throughout Taiwan to  asl, large parts of eastern, central, and southern China (Anhui, Chongqing, Fujian, Gansu, Guangdong, Guangxi, Guizhou, Hainan, Hunan, Jiangxi, Sichuan, and Zhejiang provinces), Laos, and northern Vietnam.

Habitat and ecology
B. kraepelini inhabits both primary and secondary forest habitats, often near villages. It is a nocturnal snake that is largely arboreal, although it may descend to the ground to cross roads. It preys upon small birds and lizards, and sometimes bird eggs.

Conservation status
B. kraepelini is a widespread and common species. It can be locally threatened by habitat loss. It occurs in many protected areas.

References

Further reading
Smith MA (1943). The Fauna of British India, Ceylon and Burma, Including the Whole of the Indo-Chinese Sub-region. Reptilia and Amphibia. Vol. III.—Serpentes. London: Secretary of State for India. (Taylor and Francis, printers). xii + 583 pp. (Boiga multitemporalis, p. 356).
Stejneger L (1902). "A New Opisthoglyph Snake from Formosa". Proc. Biol. Soc. Washington 15: 15–17. (Boiga kraepelini, new species).

kraepelini
Snakes of Vietnam
Snakes of Asia
Reptiles of China
Reptiles of Laos
Reptiles of Taiwan
Reptiles of Vietnam
Reptiles described in 1902
Taxa named by Leonhard Stejneger